TML may refer to:

 Taiwan Major League, former Taiwan baseball league
 TML Entertainment, record label established for the Canadian band Triumph
 Toronto Maple Leafs, Canadian pro ice hockey team
 TransducerML, transducer markup language
 TransManche Link, British-French construction consortium which built the Channel Tunnel
 Transportable moisture limit of solid bulk cargoes
 Trinidad Muslim League, an Islamic organization in Trinidad & Tobago that also controls several schools.